Nephtheis fascicularis, commonly called the lollipop tunicate, lollipop coral, or blue palm coral, is a species of tunicate that is native to the shallow reefs of Indonesia. It is the only species in its genus Nephtheis. They are not photosynthetic, and live on plankton and small organic particles obtained from the water currents. The branched stems are formed by tiny polyps called zooids.

References 

Enterogona
Animals described in 1882
Monotypic cnidarian genera